Bruce Alford may refer to:
Bruce Alford Jr. (born 1945), American football kicker
Bruce Alford Sr. (1922–2010), American football end

See also
Bryce Alford (born 1995), American basketball player